"Real" is the lead single from Plumb's studio album Beautiful Lumps of Coal. It reached the No. 41 position in the UK. The single was released digitally and physically.

Track listing
"Real" - 3:42
"Nice, Naive & Beautiful" - 4:15

Music video
The music video for "Real" shows Tiffany inside of a closet with a sleek dress and gloves on. It is in black & white.

Chart performance
The song peaked at No. 30 on Top 40 Tracks.

2004 singles
Plumb (singer) songs
Song recordings produced by Jay Joyce
2003 songs
Curb Records singles